Denis Valeryevich Sergeyev (born 24 August 1983) is a Russian professional ice hockey forward. He is currently playing for HC Neftekhimik Nizhnekamsk of the Kontinental Hockey League (KHL). He had previously played for Vityaz Chekhov of the KHL.

References

External links

WHL Profile

1983 births
Living people
HC Vityaz players
Russian ice hockey centres
Ice hockey people from Moscow
Zauralie Kurgan players